Matthew Silva (born 15 March 1970) is a Welsh rugby union coach.

Matthew Silva and similar may also mean:

Matthew Silva (footballer), Portuguese footballer
Matt Silva (soccer), a Canadian professional soccer player who plays as a goalkeeper
Matt Silva, a ring name formally used by the Australian professional wrestler Buddy Matthews